Henri Marius Ding (30 June 1844 – 1898) was a French sculptor.

Henri Ding was born in Grenoble. His most famous work is the Fontaine des trois ordres (Fountain of the three orders) on the place Notre-Dame in Grenoble. It paid tribute to Dauphiné people who brought the beginnings of the French Revolution, and was conducted to celebrate the events centennial in 1888. Ding died in Grenoble.

Henry Ding received the Légion d'honneur. Most of his works can be seen in the Museum of Grenoble.

Works
His main works include : 
The Statue of Liberty, also named Marianne, à Vizille
The Monument to Xavier Jouvin, in Grenoble
Several sculptures in the church of Le Périer
More than ten funerary monuments in the Saint Roch Cemetery, in Grenoble

Gallery

References

External links
Henri Ding's works, on Culture.gouv.fr

Chevaliers of the Légion d'honneur
Artists from Grenoble
1844 births
1898 deaths
19th-century French sculptors
French male sculptors
19th-century French male artists